György Enyedi may refer to:

* György Enyedi (Unitarian) (1555–1597), Hungarian Unitarian bishop
 György Enyedi (geographer) (1930–2012), Hungarian economist and geographer